An artificial lung (AL) is a prosthetic device that provides oxygenation of blood and removal of carbon dioxide from the blood. The AL is intended to take over some of the functionality of biological lungs. It is different from a heart-lung machine in that it is external and designed to take over the functions of the lungs for long periods of time rather than on a temporary basis.

The heart-lung machine inspired the design of AL devices, however, modern ALs are optimised to minimize patient trauma. Following the development of the heart-lung machine, Extracorporeal Membrane Oxygenation (ECMO), using a membrane oxygenator, was developed. This was intended to be used as a bridge to lung transplant (BTT), for patients too sick to wait until a donor lung was available. Mechanical Ventilation (MV) has also been used, however, it is damaging to the patient's lungs if used for extended periods of time. Both these therapies are expensive and are associated with poor quality of life, in part due to complex blood circuits required for these techniques to work.

Recent developments include simplifying the ECMO system, and devices that use 380 micron wide hollow fibers to simulate the function of alveoli have been developed. Several research groups, notably, the University of Pittsburgh, the University of Michigan, University of Maryland and Boston based groups are developing AL devices to bridge patients to lung transplant.

See also
Extracorporeal membrane oxygenation
Heart-lung machine
Lung transplantation
Medical ventilator

References

Lung
Implants (medicine)